Southwest Garo Hills is an administrative district in the State of Meghalaya, India. The Ampati Civil Sub-Division is upgraded to a full fledged district as South West Garo Hills, on 7 August 2012 with its headquarters at Ampati. It was inaugurated by Dr. Mukul Sangma, Hon'ble Chief Minister of Meghalaya, India.

History and Creation
The South West Garo Hills is carved out of present West Garo Hills, Meghalaya, India. The District comprises all the villages falling under the two Community and Rural Development Blocks, viz. Betasing and Zikzak Community and Rural Development Blocks, including 33 (thirty-three) villages under Mukdangra Gram Sevak (GS) Circle and Garobadha Gram Sevak Circle of Selsella Community & Rural Development Block, 24 (twenty-four) villages under Okkapara Songma Gram Sevak Circle and Chengkuregre Gram Sevak Circle of Gambeggre Community & Rural Development Block, 13 (thirteen) villages under Jarangkona Gram Sevak Circle of Dalu Community & Rural Development Block and Anggalgre village of Rongkhongre Gram Sevak Circle of Rongram Community & Rural Development Block.

Reorganized Gram Sevak Circle

After the reorganization of the Gram Sevak Circle all the villages annexed from other Community and Rural Development Blocks falls under Betasing Community and Rural Development Block, except for Jarangkona Gram Sevak Circle of Dalu Community & Rural Development Block which falls under Zikzak Community and Rural Development Block.

Demographics

The population of South West Garo Hills is 1,72,495 with 87,135 male and 85,360 female population as per Census 2011, which is as per the new reorganized Gram Sevak Circle of Betasing and Zikzak Community and Rural Development Blocks. The literacy rate of the District is 56.7% as per 2011 Census. Scheduled Castes and Scheduled Tribes make up 2,095 (1.21%) and 1,38,168 (80.10%) of the population. Christianity is the dominant religion, with Hinduism and Islam second-largest religions.

Language
Garo is spoken by majority of the residents of the district. Bengali, Hajong and Koch are the other major minority languages.

Garo is spoken by 88,216 people. Bengali is spoken by 45,586 whereas 10,292 people speaks Koch language.

Notable people
 Shamsul Hoque, inaugural MLA of Mahendraganj

References

External links 
 Official website

 
Districts of Meghalaya
2012 establishments in Meghalaya
Autonomous regions of India